Lars Holmqvist (born 1 September 1961) is a Swedish orienteering competitor. He received a bronze medal in the relay event at the 1995 World Orienteering Championships in Detmold, together with Jimmy Birklin, Johan Ivarsson and Jörgen Mårtensson, and placed fifth in the short distance. He placed 12th in the overall Orienteering World Cup in 1994.

References

1961 births
Living people
Swedish orienteers
Male orienteers
Foot orienteers
World Orienteering Championships medalists
21st-century Swedish people